The South African Institute of Electrical Engineers (SAIEE) is a professional association representing electrical and electronic engineers, technologists and technicians in Southern Africa. The organisation is listed as a recognised Voluntary Association by the Engineering Council of South Africa (ECSA), the statutory body that registers professional engineers, professional certificated engineers, professional engineering technologists and professional engineering technicians in South Africa. Over a century, the activities of the SAIEE have included publication, education, the promotion of electrical engineering, professional development of its members, public events, and participation in public debate affecting the profession, industry and society.

Sections

The SAIEE has sections that cover the following aspects of electrical engineering:

 Power and Energy 
 Electronics and Software
 Historical
 Rotating Machines
 Telecommunications
 Lightning
 Systems Engineering

Education

The SAIEE administers a number of university bursaries and scholarships in the field of electrical and electronic engineering in South Africa. Through its marketing and outreach activities, the organisation promotes engineering, and encourages young people to enter the profession. The SAIEE also provides accreditation for courses for Continuing Professional Development (CPD) points, as required by ECSA for renewal of professional registration.

Seminars and Lectures

The SAIEE runs regular seminars, lectures and other events for its members and the public. Notable annual events include the Bernard Price Memorial Lecture, arranged jointly with the University of the Witwatersrand since 1951, and the President's Invitation Lecture.
 SAUPEC

Publications 

 SAIEE Africa Research Journal (ARJ), a peer-reviewed journal, which changed name from Transactions of the SAIEE in 2005
 wattnow, a magazine for members

Presidents 
 Prince Moyo, 2022
 Prof. Sunil Maharaj, 2021
 (Ms) Sy Gourrah, 2020
 George Debbo, 2019
 Dr Hendri Geldenhuys, 2018
 Jacob Machinjike, 2017
 TC Madikane, 2016
 Andre Hoffmann, 2015
 Dr Pat Naidoo, 2014
 Paul van Niekerk, 2013
 Mike Cary, 2012
 Andries Tshabalala, 2011 
 Dr Angus Hay, 2010
 du Toit Grobler, 2009 Centenary Year
 VM Wilson, 2008
 IS Mckechnie, 2007
 VJ Crone, 2006
 (Ms)BM Lacquet, 2005
 BNB Ngulube, 2004
 PC Ballot, 2003
 RG Coney, 2002
 JW Gosling, 2001
 RH Hayes, 2000
 AME Schulze, 1999
 SC Bridgens, 1998
 KC Plowden, 1997
 RA Harker, 1996
 (Ms)MT Davison, 1995
 WS Calder, 1994
 MA Crouch, 1993
 DH Jacobson, 1992
 EJ Davison, 1991
 RA Leigh, 1990
 Walter Henry Milton, 1947
 Thomas P Stratten, 1940-

References

External links
 South African Institute of Electrical Engineers

Electrical engineering organizations
Engineering societies based in South Africa
Organisations based in Johannesburg